The Dharwar Craton is an Archean continental crust craton formed between 3.6-2.5 billion years ago (Ga), which is located in southern India and considered as the oldest part of the Indian peninsula.

Studies in the 2010s suggest that the craton can be separated into three crustal blocks since they show different accretionary history (i.e., the history of block collisions). The craton includes the western, central and eastern blocks and the three blocks are divided by several shear zones.

The lithologies of the Dharwar Craton are mainly TTG (Tonalite-trondhjemite-granodiorite) gneisses, volcanic-sedimentary greenstone sequences and calc-alkaline granitoids. The western Dharwar Craton contains the oldest basement rocks, with greenstone sequences between 3.0-3.4 Ga, whereas the central block of the craton mainly contains migmatitic TTG gneisses, and the eastern block contains 2.7 Ga greenstone belts and calc-alkaline plutons.

The formation of the basement rock of the Dharwar Craton was created by intraplate hotspots (i.e., volcanic activities caused by mantle plumes from the core-mantle boundary), the melting of subducted oceanic crust and the melting of thickened oceanic arc crust. The continuous melting of oceanic arc crust and mantle upwelling generated the TTG and sanukitoid plutons over the Dharwar Craton.

Overview of the regional geology

As the Dharwar Craton is located in southern India, it is geographically surrounded by the Arabian Sea, the Deccan Trap, the Eastern Ghats Mobile Belt and the Southern Granulite Belt.

Traditionally, the Dharwar Craton includes the western block and eastern block. The mylonite zone at the eastern boundary of the Chitradurga greenstone belt is the margin between the western block and the eastern block. The Chitradurga greenstone belt is an elongated linear supracrustal belt which is 400 km long from North to South.

Cratonisation is an important process to form a craton with sufficient and stable continental masses. In terms of the ages of the blocks, the western blocks is older with a cratonisation age around 3.0 Ga while the eastern block is younger with the cratonisation age around 2.5 Ga.

Lithologies

TTG gneisses 
TTG rocks are intrusive rocks with a granitic composition of quartz and feldspar but contain less potassium feldspar. In Archean craton, TTG rocks are usually present in batholiths formed by plate subduction and melting. Two kinds of gneisses can be found on the Dharwar Craton, which includes the typical TTG-type gneisses (i.e., traditional TTG with a major component of quartz and plagioclase) and the dark grey TTG banded gneisses (relatively more potassium feldspar than typical TTG gneisses):

Volcanic-sedimentary greenstone sequences 
Greenstone is metamorphosed mafic to ultramafic volcanic rock that formed in volcanic eruptions in the early stage of Earth formation. The volcanic-sedimentary greenstone sequence occupies the majority of the Archean crustal record, which is about 30%. The western block comprises the greenstone sequences with adequate sediments, while the central block and the eastern block comprise the greenstone sequences with adequate volcanic rocks but minor sediments.

Sanukitoids (Calc-alkaline granitoids) 
Sanukitoids are granitoids with high-magnesium composition that are commonly formed by plate collision events in Archean. In the Dharwar Craton, there is no sanukitoid record in the western block. However, there are a lot of granitoid intrusions in the central block, which become less in the eastern block.

Anatectic granites 
Anatectic granite is a kind of rock formed by the partial melting of the pre-existing crustal rock, which is relatively younger than the TTG and greenstone in the Dharwar Craton. The granites usually cut across the older rocks.

Metamorphic record 
When the rocks were under subductions, they experienced high temperature and pressure leading to the chemical changes and textural changes of rocks (i.e., metamorphism). The mineral assemblages of the metamorphic rocks can tell us how high the temperature and pressure are when they are under the peak metamorphism (the progress with the highest pressure and temperature). The metamorphic rocks in the Dharwar Craton usually recorded the mineral assemblages from amphibolite facies to granulite facies:

Archean crust accretions 
Accretions mean the collisions between plates leading to the plate subduction. Crust accretions are important in the Dharwar Craton since the continuous volcanic eruptions caused by accretions led to the formation of Archean felsic continent crust.

For finding when the Archean crust accretions happened, the parent-daughter isotopes dating, like uranium-lead (U-Pb) decay could be used to find out the ages of the events.

According to the zircon U-Pb ages of the TTG gneisses from the Dharwar Craton, there were 5 major accretion events leading to the formation of the Archean felsic continental crust. The events occurred with the ranges of age 3450–3300, 3230–3200, 3150–3000, 2700–2600 and 2560–2520 million years ago (Ma).

The western block records the two earliest crust accretion events, that happened in 3450 Ma and 3230 Ma. The rates of the continental growth of the two events are fast since the events led to the widespread of greenstone volcanism. 

The central block records 4 major accretion events, that occurred in 3375 Ma, 3150 Ma, 2700 Ma and 2560 Ma. The isotopic data suggests that the scale of the continental growth due to felsic crust accretion was large during 2700–2600 Ma and 2560–2520 Ma, leading to the large-scale greenstone volcanism at that time. 

The eastern block records the 2 latest major accretion events occurring in 2700 Ma and 2560 Ma with massive continental growth.

Crustal reworking events 
Crustal reworking means the old rocks (protoliths) are destroyed and regenerated into new rocks. The continental crust is relatively old if the crust experienced crustal reworking events. For the rocks that experienced crustal reworking, minerals like zircon, which is difficult to melt, are preserved in the reworked rocks. Some new zircons with a younger age would be formed in the reworking events.

The crustal reworking events happened in the time range of 3100–3000 Ma. All 3 crustal blocks record the crustal reworking events in 2520 Ma due to the final assembly of the Superia supercontinent. 

For the western block, there are two reworking events. The first event happened in 3100–3000 Ma accounting to the emplacement of granite. The second reworking event led to the emplacement of 2640–2600 Ma of granites.

For the central block, the event happened in 3140 Ma is considered as the earliest crustal reworking due to the TTG accretion event between 3230–3140 Ma in the central block of the craton. 

For the eastern block, the second highest-temperature reworking event was recorded in the centre of the block, which happened in 2640–2620 Ma. The reworking event is related to the greenstone volcanism of the TTG accretion event in 2700 Ma.

Formation and evolution

Intraplate hotspot model 

Before 3400 Ma, the magma upwelling from the mantle led to the intraplate hotspot setting. The upwelling magma formed the oceanic plateaus with komatiites and komatiitic basalts in the oceanic crust.

Two-stage melting of oceanic crust 

After the mantle plume hotspots were formed, the tectonic setting was followed by the two-stage melting, which include the melting of the subducted oceanic crust and the melting of the thickened oceanic arc crust.

In 3350 Ma, due to the ridge push from the oceanic spreading centres (mid-oceanic ridges), some oceanic crust subducted under the mantle. The subduction led to the melting of the subducted crust and formed magma that rose to the oceanic crust and formed oceanic island arc crust.

During 3350–3270 Ma, the mafic to ultramafic hydrous melt formed by the slab melting melted the base of the thickened oceanic arc crust, which formed the TTG melt, as well as magmatic protoliths of TTGs in the oceanic arc crust.

During 3230–3100 Ma, the continuous collision of the oceanic island arc crust, the TTG and oceanic plateaus, that are formed in the previous stage, caused the melting of the juvenile crust in the oceanic island arc, which generated trondhjemite plutons in 3200 Ma. The trondhjemite emplacement generated heat and fluid that led to the melting that made the low-density TTG crust rose while the high-density greenstone volcanics sank, which developed the dome-keel structures between the TTG and greenstone.

Stage of transitional TTGs 
The transitional TTGs, which were recorded in the central and eastern blocks, was formed during 2700–2600 Ma. The transitional TTGs are relatively enriched in incompatible elements. The enrichment of the incompatible elements could be account for the high-angle subduction and the chemical interaction between the mantle wedge and the melt from the subducted crust.

During the 2700 Ma, the central and eastern block of the Dharwar Craton had developed into microcontinents. The weathering and erosion of the microcontinents led to a large amount of detrital input to the ocean floor and subduction zone. Therefore, the subducted slab with a large amount of sediment brought incompatible elements into the mantle due to a high-angle subduction. The mantle wedge interacted with the slab, leading to the partial enrichment of the incompatible elements in the wedge and generated mafic to intermediate magma. The mafic magma rose and accumulated under the oceanic arc crust, leading to the partial melting of the thickened, incompatible element enriched arc crust and their magma mixed to form the transitional TTGs during 2700–2600 Ma.

Shifting from oceanic crust melting to mantle melting 
After the transitional TTG accretion, the inflexible subducted oceanic crust broke and fell into the asthenosphere, leading to the mantle upwelling under the pre-existing crust. The upwelling mantle rock rose to the shallow depth and melted the upper mantle to generate intermediate to mafic magma. Then, the magma intruded into the middle part of the crust. It underwent differentiation in magma chambers. The heat from the magma transferred into the surrounding rock leading to the partial melting of gneisses and the formation of calc-alkaline granitoids.

Sanukitoid magmatism 

Sanukitoids were formed during the Neoarchean magmatic accretion events, that are originated from the mantle with low silicon dioxide and high magnesium. The sanukitoid magma could be generated by either plate subduction or plume setting. 

The sanukitoids created by subduction might lead to the chemical alteration of the mantle wedge and the melting of the wedge. The peridotitic mantle wedge was mixed with intermediate to felsic melts. This can be explained by the mixing of the previous TTG melts. The sanukitoids created by plume setting would lead to the sanukitoid intrusions with high magnesium content and low silicon dioxide. 

The sanukitoid magmatism is not related to the TTG accretion events during 3450–3000 Ma. The magmatism was followed by the transitional TTG accretion event in 2600 Ma and only occurred in the central and eastern blocks. Since the sanukitoids are enriched in both incompatible and compatible elements, while the TTGs are not, it indicates the appearance of the sanukitoid magmatism shows the tectonic change from melting of oceanic crust to melting of mantle during the period of 2600–2500 Ma.

Closure of subduction zones 
During 2560–2500 Ma, the three blocks joined together to form the Dharwar Craton and all the subduction zones closed, followed by the regional metamorphism due to heat release from the mantle during 2535–2500 Ma. The final cratonisation finished in 2400 Ma through slow cooling.

Implication for global crust history

See also

 Subduction zone metamorphism
 Geochronology
 Thermochronology
 Magma differentiation

References

Cratons
Geology of India